The Girls Doubles tournament of the 2013 BWF World Junior Championships was held from October 29 until November 3. South Korean pair Lee So-hee and Shin Seung-chan won the tournament for the last 2 editions.

South Korea continued their domination in girls doubles after Chae Yoo-jung and Kim Ji-won won the final match 21–19, 21–15 against Chen Qingchen her partner He Jiaxin from China.

Seeded

  Huang Dongping / Jia Yifan (semi-final)
  Chen Qingchen / He Jiaxin (final)
  Julie Finne-Ipsen / Rikke Soby Hansen (quarter-final)
  Lam Narissapat / Puttita Supajirakul (semi-final)
  Chae Yoo-jung / Kim Ji-won (champion)
  Joyce Choong Wai Chi / Yap Cheng Wen (third round)
  Chisato Hoshi / Ayako Sakuramoto (quarter-final)
  Rosyita Eka Putri Sari / Setyana Mapasa (quarter-final)
  Pacharapun Chochuwong / Chanisa Teachavorasinskun (second round)
  Victoria Dergunova / Olga Morozova (third round)
  Du Yue / Li Yinhui (third round)
  Maiken Fruergaard / Isabella Nielsen (second round)
  Arisa Higashino / Aoi Matsuda (quarter-final)
  Mila Ivanova / Maria Mitsova (third round)
  Uswatun Khasanah / Masita Mahmudin (third round)
  Maja Pavlinic / Dorotea Sutara (third round)

Draw

Finals

Top Half

Section 1

Section 2

Section 3

Section 4

Bottom Half

Section 5

Section 6

Section 7

Section 8

References
Main Draw (Archived 2013-10-29)

2013 BWF World Junior Championships
2013 in youth sport